Jarvis (also known as The Jarvis Cocker Record) is the debut solo album by Pulp vocalist and musician Jarvis Cocker, released in the UK on 13 November 2006.

Overview
Two songs from the album, "Don't Let Him Waste Your Time" and "Baby's Coming Back to Me", were previously released on Nancy Sinatra's self-titled 2004 album.

The complete version of the song "The Loss Adjuster" appeared as b-side to "Fat Children" single.

Steve Mackey and Mark Webber, fellow band members from Pulp play on this record. Antony Genn, a former Pulp member, and Richard Hawley, who toured and performed, also play on the album. Candida Doyle has played on various tracks when performed live.

The song "Running the World" can be heard during the closing credits of the film Children of Men.

Reception

Initial critical response to Jarvis was very positive. At Metacritic, which assigns a normalised rating out of 100 to reviews from mainstream critics, the album has received an average score of 82, based on 30 reviews.

"Running the World" 2019 chart entry 
After a public campaign to make the song "Running the World" the UK Christmas 2019 No. 1, the song entered the official UK singles chart at No. 48 and entered The Official Big Top 40 at No. 3.

Track listing
All tracks written by Jarvis Cocker, except for "Black Magic" by Cocker and Steve Mackey

 "The Loss Adjuster (Excerpt 1)" – 0:29
 "Don't Let Him Waste Your Time" – 4:09
 "Black Magic" – 4:21
 Contains a sample from "Crimson and Clover" (Tommy James, Peter Lucia), recorded by Tommy James and the Shondells.
 "Heavy Weather" – 3:49
 "I Will Kill Again" – 3:45
 "Baby's Coming Back to Me" – 4:09
 "Fat Children" – 3:23
 "From Auschwitz to Ipswich" – 3:49
 "Disney Time" – 3:04
 "Tonite" – 3:56
 "Big Julie" – 4:41
 Contains a short isolated clip of Carson McCullers reading from her book The Member of the Wedding, taken from her spoken word album "The Member of the Wedding" and Other Works (1958) as an intro.
 "The Loss Adjuster (Excerpt 2)" – 0:29
 "Quantum Theory" – 4:40"Running The World" – 4:50
"Running the World" is included as a hidden track on the CD, 30 minutes on from the end of "Quantum Theory". The vinyl version of the album features the track on a separate 45 rpm single.

Personnel
Personnel adapted from Jarvis liner notes.

Band
 Jarvis Cocker – lead vocal , backing vocals , piano , acoustic guitar , electric guitar , Roland SH-1000 , Solina String Ensemble , synth brass , tubular bells , band bells , tremolo guitar , Hammond organ , Mellotron flute , Memorymoog , glockenspiel , Del Rey guitar , Clavioline , six-string bass , vibraphone , Roland Vocoder Plus 
 Richard Hawley – electric guitar , guitar , Hawaiian guitar , lap steel guitar , electric twelve-string guitar , piano , vibraphone , brushes , acoustic guitar , harmony vocal , Hoover guitar , baritone guitar , ring guitar , enchanted lyre , celeste 
 Steve Mackey – bass , electric vibraphone , acoustic guitar 
 Ross Orton – drums , timpani , guitar case , egg , acoustic guitar 

Additional musicians
 Martin Slattery – piano , saxophone 
 Antony Genn – harmony vocal 
 Alasdair Malloy – percussion , band bells , rainmaker , marimba , conga , percussion and tuned percussion arrangement , glockenspiel 
 Graham Sutton – additional keyboards , string arrangement 
 Jason Buckle – Wasp synthesiser , cruise liner keyboard 
 Richard B Humphries – storm recording 
 Philip Sheppard – string arrangement , choral arrangement 

Technical
 Graham Sutton – mixing , engineering
 Robbie Nelson – engineering
 Colin Elliot – assistant engineering 
 Liam Walsh – assistant engineering 
 Mike Timm – assistant engineering 
 Sebastian Gohier – assistant engineering 
 Mat Bartram – assistant engineering 
 Adrian Breakspear – assistant engineering 
 Mark Bishop – assistant engineering 
 Joe Hirst – assistant engineering 
 Lee Slater – assistant engineering 
 Neil Comber – assistant engineering 
 Simon Hayes – assistant engineering 
 Andrew Rugg – assistant engineering 
 Tim Young – mastering 
 Phill Brown – engineering 

Choir
 Rob Johnston
 Emma Brain-Gabbott
 Julia Doyle
 Ildiko Allen
 Alexandra Gibson
 Andrew Busher
 Emer McParland
 Margaret Cameron

Strings
 Martin Burgess – violin
 Harriet Davies – violin
 Harvey De Souza – violin
 Takane Funatsu – violin
 Jo Godden – violin
 Janice Graham – violin
 David Juritz – violin
 Julian Leaper – violin
 Steve Morris – violin
 Celia Sheen – violin
 Amanda Smith – violin
 Simon Smith – violin
 Julian Tear – violin
 Catherine Bradshaw – viola
 Jane Atkins – viola
 William Hawkes – viola
 Richard Nelson – viola
 Bob Smissen – viola
 Adrian Bradbury – cello
 David Cohen – cello
 Stephen Orton – cello
 Jonathan Williams – cello
 Chris Laurence – double bass
 Stephen Mair – double bass

Design
 The Designers Republic – design
 Jarvis Cocker – design
 Serge Leblon – photography

Chart positions

References

2006 debut albums
Jarvis Cocker albums
Rough Trade Records albums